Clement Haughton Langston Cazalet   (16 July 1869 – 23 March 1950) was a British tennis player who competed in the 1908 Summer Olympics.

He was the son among 10 children of businessman William Clement Cazalet (brother of Edward Cazalet) and Emmeline Agnes Cazalet (nee Fawcett). Cazalet was educated at Rugby School and Trinity College, Cambridge.

In 1908 he won the bronze medal in the men's doubles competition together with his partner Charles Dixon.

While serving in the First World War as a Major and volunteer ambulance driver with the British Red Cross Society and St John Ambulance Brigade, Cazalet was awarded the Distinguished Service Order in the 1917 Birthday Honours. By profession he was a marine engineer who worked on undersea cable laying projects in the Atlantic and Pacific Ocean.

References

1869 births
1950 deaths
English male tennis players
Olympic bronze medallists for Great Britain
Olympic tennis players of Great Britain
People from Westminster
Tennis people from Greater London
Tennis players at the 1908 Summer Olympics
Olympic medalists in tennis
Medalists at the 1908 Summer Olympics
Companions of the Distinguished Service Order
British Army personnel of World War I
People educated at Rugby School
Alumni of Trinity College, Cambridge
British male tennis players
Clement